United Left of the Valencian Country is the Valencian federation of the Spanish left wing political and social movement United Left. Marga Sanz is the current General Coordinator and Ignacio Blanco Giner its spokesperson.

The Communist Party of the Valencian Country (PCPV, Valencian federation of PCE) is the major member of the coalition.

Election results

Valencian elections

See also
United Left (Spain)

References

External links

Valencian Community
Political parties in the Valencian Community